Pinehurst is an unincorporated community in Washington County, in the U.S. state of Ohio.

History
Former variant names were Upper Mile Run and Lower Mile Run; the community adopted the name Pinehurst in the mid-20th century.

References

Unincorporated communities in Washington County, Ohio